Union Sportive de Carthage Women's Volleyball Club (Arabic: نادي اتحاد قرطاج للكرة الطائرة سيدات, English: Carthage Union Volleyball Club or USC) is a Tunisian women's Volleyball team based in Carthage, Tunis Town Since the year 1994 and it is currently playing in the Tunisian Women's Volleyball League Top Division, The Club have some success when they won the Tunisian Championship for 2 Occasions also they have the Tunisian Volleyball Cup Crown for 2 times.

Honours

National titles

 Tunisian Volleyball League 2 :
 Champions :  2007–08, 2010–11
 Vice Champion :

 Tunisian Volleyball Cup 2 :
 Champions : 2009–10, 2010–11
 Runners Up :

Current squad 2017–18

Head coaches
This is a list of the senior team's head coaches in the recent years.

As of 2018

Notable players

References

External links
 Official Facebook Page

Tunisian volleyball clubs
Volleyball clubs established in 1994
1994 establishments in Tunisia